Bandstand is the sixth studio album by the British progressive rock band Family. Released in 1972, it was their second and last album to chart in the United States. The original album cover was die-cut in the shape of a Bush TV22 television set, with a black-and-white image of the band onscreen.

Background
Bandstand marked a notable change of direction for the band. Family's sound had become more mainstream and somewhat more conventional. By Roger Chapman's own admission, he and Charlie Whitney were getting more standardised in their songwriting, relying more on choruses and regular verse structure. Their sound was brought closer to the mainstream by British soul singer Linda Lewis contributing backing vocals, and Del Newman string arrangements.

Bandstand opened with "Burlesque", a straight rocker about a bar of that name in Chapman and Whitney's hometown of Leicester, England. Released as a single in the UK, it got up to number thirteen on the UK Singles Chart. Heavier songs on Bandstand included "Broken Nose", an angry sexual rant involving the British class structure, and "Ready To Go", a swipe at Family's detractors in the British rock press. Family also were becoming more adept with introspective tunes like "Coronation", about an apartment dweller ruminating about his neighbours and his own dishevelled flat, and "Dark Eyes," an atmospheric, sensual ballad Chapman wrote with Poli Palmer. Many Family fans cited "Glove", a soulful power ballad about meeting a woman through an act of chivalry, as one of their best songs ever. "My Friend the Sun", a straight acoustic ballad, displayed a tenderness previously absent in Chapman's vocal style. It was also issued as a single in the UK, but did not chart.

Bandstand was the last Family album to feature John Wetton. Having joined the band only a year earlier and being a large vocal and instrumental presence on Fearless, Wetton's role in the band was reduced on Bandstand, and he left to join King Crimson. He was replaced by Jim Cregan, and the group toured North America with Elton John immediately after Bandstand'''s release . They received favourable exposure from American critics and radio DJs and built up a small but loyal cult following in the US as a result.Bandstand is the only Family album not to feature an instrumental track. Spectacles Records issued a glow-in-the-dark vinyl picture disc version of this album, the album reissued as a double with the Family compilation "Old Songs, New Songs" on sepia-coloured translucent vinyl. This rare double album, in a clear plastic sleeve, regularly reaches up to $4,000 when it turns up at auction.

Track listing
All selections are by Charlie Whitney and Roger Chapman except where noted.

 Note: "Bolero Babe is incorrectly listed as 4:11 on original LP labels.

Personnel
Family
Roger Chapman – lead vocals, percussion, soprano saxophone (2)
Charlie Whitney – guitars, keyboards (2)
Poli Palmer – keyboards, vibes, flute, percussion, guitar (4)
John Wetton – basses, backing vocals, guitars
Rob Townsend – drums, percussion

Guest artists
 Linda Lewis – backing vocals (5)
 Del Newman – string arrangements

Song cover versions
The song "My Friend the Sun" was later covered by Linda Lewis for her 1977 album Woman Overboard, with harmonica by Peter Hope Evans and keyboards by Max Middleton. It was also covered by Peter Holsapple and Chris Stamey of the North Carolina band  the dB's on their 2009 duo album Here and Now''.

Chart positions
Highest chart position (UK) – #15
Highest chart position (USA) – No. 183

References

External links
 

Bandstand (album)|Bandstand
Bandstand ( album)|Bandstand
Albums produced by George Chkiantz
Reprise Records albums